Saving Max is the first novel written by American author Antoinette van Heugten. It was published by Mira Books in 2010. The novel is about attorney Danielle Parkman and her son Max, a teenager with Asperger syndrome who is accused of murdering another patient at a mental hospital.  The novel addresses Munchausen syndrome by proxy as the villain murders her own son after subjecting him to a lifetime of abuse while glorying in the limelight of medical attention. The book spent two weeks in USA Today list of the top 150 books, where it peaked at position 135. Saving Max has sold 500,000 copies.

References

External links
Official site: Saving Max

2010 American novels
American thriller novels
Books about autism
2010 debut novels
Mira Books books